Some of My Best Friends Are... is a 1971 drama film written and directed by Mervyn Nelson and starring Fannie Flagg, Rue McClanahan, and Candy Darling.

Premise
On Christmas Eve 1971, in Manhattan's Greenwich Village, a group of gay men and lesbians meet at the mob-owned Blue Jay Bar to talk about their lives and relationships.

Cast
 Fannie Flagg as Helen/Mildred
 Rue McClanahan as Lita Joyce
 Candy Darling as Karen/Harry
 David Drew as Howard
 Tom Bade as Tanny
 Jim Enzel as Gable
 Jeff David as Leo
 Nick De Noia as Phil
 Clifton Steere as Gertie
 James Murdock (credited as David Baker) as Clint
 Paul Blake as Kenny
 Carleton Carpenter as Miss Untouchable
 Robert Christian as Eric
 Dick O'Neill as Tim
 Gary Campbell as Terry
 Gil Gerard as Scott
 Lou Steele as Barrett
 Uva Harden as Michel
 Ben Yaffe as Marvin
 Gary Sandy as Jim
 Peg Murray as Terry's mother
 Sylvia Syms (singer) as Sadie

See also
 List of American films of 1971
 List of Christmas films

References

External links
 
 

1971 films
1970s Christmas drama films
1970s Christmas films
1971 LGBT-related films
American independent films
American LGBT-related films
American Christmas drama films
1971 independent films
Transgender-related films
Films set in 1971
Films set in Manhattan
LGBT-related drama films
1971 drama films
1970s English-language films
1970s American films